Thomas Boerma (born May 7, 1981 in Laren) is a field hockey player from the Netherlands.

Boerma was part of the Dutch national team for the 2006 Champions Trophy in Terrassa where the Dutch won the gold. In 2007, he also was part of the team that won the gold medal at the European Championships in Manchester. In Kuala Lumpur later in 2007, he won the bronze medal at the Champions Trophy, while in 2008 they only finished in fourth place in Rotterdam. He also is part of the Dutch team that qualified for the 2008 Summer Olympics.

References

External links
 

1981 births
Living people
Sportspeople from Laren, North Holland
Dutch male field hockey players
Olympic field hockey players of the Netherlands
Field hockey players at the 2008 Summer Olympics
21st-century Dutch people